Ishtam (English translation: Liking) is a Telugu movie produced by Ramoji Rao (Eenadu Group) and directed by Vikram Kumar and Raj Kumar. It starred Charan Dodla, Shriya, Poonam Dhillon and Chandra Mohan.

This is the debut movie of actress Shriya. Charan paired up with Saran for the first time. This was Charan's only film as an actor as he didn't act in any other film after this.

Plot

Karthik (Charan), hailing from a rich family, is quite inept in his academics. Neha (Shriya Saran) is Subbu's (Chandra Mohan) daughter and she's motherless. Karthik is the senior of Neha in the college and rags her quite a bit. When Karthik's mother Lakshmi (Poonam Dhillon) meets with an accident, Neha rescues and admits her in a hospital.  Over time, Lakshmi and Neha become friends and Neha falls in love with Karthik. But when Subbu proposes to get Karthik and Neha married, Lakshmi refuses. The film is about why Lakshmi doesn't accept the marriage, who initially wanted Neha to marry Karthik.

Cast
 Charan Dodla as Karthik
 Shriya Saran as Neha
 Chandra Mohan as Subrahmanyam "Subbu", Neha's father
 Poonam Dhillon as Lakshmi, Karthik's mother
 Sarath Babu as Chakravarthy, Karthik's father
 Jayasudha as Neha's mother
 Srinivasa Reddy as Ravi, Karthik's friend
 Khayyum as Raghu, Karthik's friend
 Naveen as Gopi
 Sravan as Sravan

Soundtrack
The music was composed by DJ Gopinath and released by Mayuri Audio.

References

External links
 

2000s Telugu-language films
2001 films
Films directed by Vikram Kumar